Housemaster is a 1938 British comedy drama film directed by Herbert Brenon and starring Otto Kruger, Diana Churchill and Phillips Holmes. It was made by ABPC at its Elstree Studios. When three young women come to stay at an elite public school, they cause disruption amongst the male students and teachers. It was based on the 1936 play of the same name by Ian Hay.

Cast
 Otto Kruger as Charles Donkin
 Diana Churchill as Rosemary Faringdon
 Phillips Holmes as Philip de Pourville
 Joyce Barbour as Barbara Fane
 Rene Ray as Chris Faringdon
 Kynaston Reeves as The Rev. Edmund Ovington
 Walter Hudd as Frank Hastings
 Michael Shepley as Victor Beamish
 John Wood as Flossie Nightingale
 Cecil Parker as Sir Berkely Nightingale
 Henry Hepworth as Bimbo Faringdon
 Rosamund Barnes as Button Faringdon
 Laurence Kitchin as Crump
 Jimmy Hanley as Travers

References

Bibliography
 Low, Rachael. History of the British Film: Filmmaking in 1930s Britain. George Allen & Unwin, 1985 .
 Warren, Patricia. Elstree: The British Hollywood. Columbus Books, 1998.

External links

1938 films
1938 comedy-drama films
British comedy-drama films
1930s English-language films
Films shot at Associated British Studios
Films directed by Herbert Brenon
Films set in England
British films based on plays
Films based on works by Ian Hay
Films set in schools
British black-and-white films
1930s British films